The Celta train is a train connection from the Portuguese railway operator Comboios de Portugal and the Spanish railway operator Renfe Operadora between Campanhã railway station in Porto (Portugal) and Vigo-Guixar railway station in Vigo (Spain).

The service runs twice every day in each direction, taking 2 hours and 20 minutes to connect both cities.

References

External links 
 Timetable Celta train from CP official website (pdf)

Named passenger trains of Spain
Named passenger trains of Portugal